"Outtathaway!" is the third single by Australian alternative rock band the Vines from their debut album Highly Evolved. It was released in Australia as a radio edit single via Engine Room Music/EMI on 18 November 2002, which peaked at No. 38 on the ARIA Singles Chart. It is the Vines' highest charting single and was written by the group's lead singer and guitarist, Craig Nicholls. The song was used in the feature film, Bruce Almighty (May 2003), but was not included on the official movie soundtrack album.

Music video 
The music video, directed by David LaChapelle, sees the band in a club, playing in front of a debauched crowd (notably, the video starts with one fan slapping his own face with a sneaker). During the song, Nicholls drifts around the microphone slashing at his guitar while gig-goers drink and dive off balconies and crowd surf. The video grows more frantic and feverish as the song progresses, with the camera occasionally cutting to images of Nicholls and friends stumbling around the halls, destroying dressing rooms and break dancing in the toilets. During the video, a girl rushes up on stage to hug Nicholls, who he apparently throws over his shoulder. At the very end, bassist and drummer are swarmed by the crowd, while Nicholls discards his guitar and gives the drum kit a hug.

Track listing

Charts

References

The Vines (band) songs
2002 singles
Music videos directed by David LaChapelle
2002 songs
Songs written by Craig Nicholls
EMI Records singles